Process Vision is a Finnish privately owned IT company.

The company specialises in applications for controlling electricity generation and distribution for large-scale energy companies. Process Vision's customers include various city- and nation-scale energy companies in the Nordic countries, the Baltic countries and Germany. Process Vision has over 100 employees, and has four offices: the main office in Helsinki, and branch offices in Jyväskylä, Kuopio, and Uppsala, Sweden.

The company was founded in 1993 by CEO Simo Makkonen.

References 

Software companies of Finland